In cross-coupling reactions, the component reagents are called cross-coupling partners or simply coupling partners.  These reagents can be further classified according to their nucleophilic vs electrophilic character:
R-X  +  R'-Y  →   R-R'  +  XY
Typically the electrophilic coupling partner (R-X) is an aryl halide, but triflates are also used.  Nucleophilic coupling (R'-Y) partners are more diverse.  In the Suzuki reaction, boronic esters and boronic acids serve as nucleophilic coupling partners.  Expanding the scope of coupling partners is a focus methods development in organic synthesis.

References

Carbon-carbon bond forming reactions